Flora Anne Armitage (21 October 1911, in Yorkshire, England – 6 February 1995, in Webster, Texas) was an England-born American biographer and novelist. She was a Guggenheim Fellow for the academic year 1957–1958.

With her family, Flora Armitage immigrated in 1927 to the United States from England. The family settled in Texas. She became a U.S. citizen in April 1937 in Houston. In 1945 she moved to New York City to work for British Information Services (a branch of British government propaganda effort),  which employed her until her retirement.

Armitage is mainly known for her 1955 biography of T. E. Lawrence. The biography was translated into three languages. Her published work includes three novels, short fiction, and essays. When she died she was working on a biography of W. H. Hudson. At the time of her death, her unpublished work included "at least four other novels, a series of short stories, and some poetry".

Selected publications

References

1911 births
1995 deaths
20th-century American biographers
American women biographers
20th-century American novelists
British emigrants to the United States
American women novelists
Writers from Yorkshire
20th-century American women writers